Biscayne Park can refer to:

Biscayne National Park
Biscayne Park, Florida